The 2008 AIBA Youth World Boxing Championships were held in Guadalajara, Mexico, from October 31 to November 1, 2008. It was the first edition of the AIBA Youth World Boxing Championships which had taken over from the Junior World Championship. The competition is under the supervision of the world's governing body for amateur boxing  AIBA and is the junior version of the World Amateur Boxing Championships.

A total of 359 fighters from 68 different countries registered to compete in the inaugural edition of the competition.

Medal winners

Medal table

See also
 World Amateur Boxing Championships

References

Youth World Amateur Boxing Championships
Boxing
Youth, 2008
Youth World Boxing Championships 2008
Sport in Guadalajara, Jalisco
Boxing competitions in Mexico
21st century in Guadalajara, Jalisco